The Eagle Tavern is a historic tavern built in the 1790s in Halifax, Halifax County, North Carolina. The tavern (known as the "Eagle Hotel" in the 1820s) served as an overnight stop on February 27, 1825 for the official traveling party during the Visit of the Marquis de Lafayette to the United States. The tavern is demarcated as "E-68" on the North Carolina Highway Historical Marker Program. It is a two-story, pedimented, "T"-shaped tripartite frame building. It was moved to its present site in the 1840s.

It was listed on the National Register of Historic Places in 1973.

References

Taverns in the United States
Hotel buildings on the National Register of Historic Places in North Carolina
National Register of Historic Places in Halifax County, North Carolina
Beer in North Carolina
Drinking establishments in North Carolina
Buildings and structures in Halifax, North Carolina